Albøge Parish was a parish in Norddjurs Municipality, on Djursland peninsula in Denmark. Until the 1970 Danish Municipal Reform, it was a part of the Djurs Sønder Herred estate in former Randers County. In 2021, it was merged with Lyngby Parish into Lyngby-Albøge Parish.

The following settlements and localities are found within Albøge Parish:

 Albøge
 Hallendrup
 Kærby
 Søby

References 

Norddjurs Municipality
Parishes of Denmark